Stoke Golding railway station is a disused railway station on the former Ashby and Nuneaton Joint Railway. It served the village of Stoke Golding. It closed in 1931 to passengers but closed to parcel traffic in 1951. Goods continued to pass through until 1962 when the line was closed from Shenton to Stoke Golding. The site is now a private residence and the goods yard is now an industrial estate.

References

http://www.shackerstonefestival.co.uk/ANJR/Hstoke_golding.htm

Disused railway stations in Leicestershire
Railway stations in Great Britain opened in 1873
Railway stations in Great Britain closed in 1931
Former London and North Western Railway stations
Former Midland Railway stations